Fatma Şahin (born 20 June 1966) is a Turkish chemical engineer and politician. On 6 July 2011 she was appointed as the Minister of Family and Social Policies in the third cabinet of Erdoğan.

She was born on 20 June 1966 in Gaziantep to Mustafa and Perihan Şahin. She was educated in chemical engineering at the Istanbul Technical University. Fatma Şahin worked as an engineer and manager in the textile industry.

She entered politics together with her husband İzzet Şahin and co-founded the Justice and Development Party. Taking active part in the provincial organization, she was elected three times deputy from her hometown. She is the first female member of the Turkish parliament elected from Gaziantep and from the Southeastern Anatolia Region. Fatma Şahin served as the chairperson of women's branch of her party.

Following the 2011 general elections, she became the only female minister in the third cabinet of Prime Minister Recep Tayyip Erdoğan. She was replaced by Ayşenur İslam on 25 December 2013 in a cabinet reshuffle.

As a result of the 2014 local elections, Şahin was elected as the first female mayor of Gaziantep. In 2019 local elections, she was elected again as the mayor.

She has two children, a son and a daughter.

References

1966 births
People from Gaziantep
Istanbul Technical University alumni
Turkish chemical engineers
Turkish women chemists
Turkish chemists
Living people
Deputies of Gaziantep
Justice and Development Party (Turkey) politicians
Women government ministers of Turkey
Government ministers of Turkey
Members of the 24th Parliament of Turkey
Members of the 23rd Parliament of Turkey
Members of the 22nd Parliament of Turkey
21st-century Turkish women politicians
Ministers of Family and Social Policy of Turkey
Women mayors of places in Turkey
Mayors of places in Turkey